Plagiostropha bicolor is a species of sea snail, a marine gastropod mollusk in the family Drilliidae.

Description
The length of the shell varies between 9 mm and 14 mm.

Distribution
This marine species occurs off the Philippines and Japan.

References

 Chino M. & Stahlschmidt P. (2010) New species of Plagiostropha (Gastropoda: Drillidae) from the Philippines and Japan. Visaya 2(6):82–87

External links
 

bicolor
Gastropods described in 2010